Liberationist may refer to:

 An advocate of liberation or a liberation movement, such as:
 Abolition of serfdom and slavery
 Men's liberation
 Proletarian liberation
 Racial liberation
 Sexual liberation
 Women's liberation
 Animal liberation
 Liberation psychology, an approach to psychology focusing on countering oppression
 Liberation theology, an approach to theology focusing on countering oppression
 In the 19th century, an advocate of Church of England disestablishment

See also 
 Liberation (disambiguation)